Shim Jae-min (born February 18, 1994, in Busan) is a South Korean pitcher. He bats right-handed and throws left-handed.

Professional career

In the  KBO Draft, Shim was selected by the KT Wiz as the first overall pick, along with Yu Hui-woon.

External links 
Career statistics and player information from Korea Baseball Organization

South Korean baseball players
KT Wiz players
1994 births
Living people
Sportspeople from Busan